Tim Taranto (born 28 January 1998) is a professional Australian rules footballer playing for the Richmond Football Club in the Australian Football League (AFL), having been initially drafted to  as pick 2 in the 2016 AFL draft.

Early life
He played TAC Cup football for the Sandringham Dragons and was drafted by Greater Western Sydney with their first selection and second overall in the 2016 national draft. He made his debut in the 56-point loss against  in the opening round of the 2017 season at Adelaide Oval.

AFL career

Personal life
Taranto was born in Melbourne to an Australian mother and an American father from Texas. His parents separated when he was two and his father returned to the United States, although they regularly visit one another. Tim was regularly looked after by his maternal grandparents, Paul and Dianne. Paul has been to every single game since Tim was drafted into GWS. He attended St Kevin's College, Melbourne from the age of 10.

Growing up, Taranto supported the Melbourne Football Club.

Statistics
 Statistics are correct to Semi Final 2021. 

|- style="background:#eaeaea;"
! scope="row" style="text-align:center" | 2017
|style="text-align:center;"|
| 14 || 14 || 7 || 4 || 105 || 110 || 215 || 31 || 54 || 0.5 || 0.3 || 7.5 || 7.9 || 15.4 || 2.2 || 3.9
|-
! scope="row" style="text-align:center" | 2018
|style="text-align:center;"|
| 14 || 23 || 6 || 14 || 271 || 208 || 479 || 83 || 140 || 0.3 || 0.6 || 11.8 || 9.0 || 20.8 || 3.6 || 6.1
|- style="background:#eaeaea;"
! scope="row" style="text-align:center" | 2019
|style="text-align:center;"|
| 14 || 26 || 11 || 13 || 430 || 290 || 720 || 120 || 165 || 0.4 || 0.5 || 16.5 || 11.2 || 27.7 || 4.6 || 6.3
|-
! scope="row" style="text-align:center" | 2020
|style="text-align:center;"|
| 14 || 11 || 4 || 3 || 132 || 80 || 212 || 30 || 45 || 0.4 || 0.3 || 12.0 || 7.3 || 19.3 || 2.7 || 4.1
|-
! scope="row" style="text-align:center" | 2021
|style="text-align:center;"|
| 14 || 24 || 13 || 13 || 372 || 265 || 637 || 118 || 127 || 0.5 || 0.5 || 15.5 || 11.0 || 26.5 || 4.9 || 5.2
|- style="background:#eaeaea;"
|- class="sortbottom"
! colspan=3| Career
! 98
! 41
! 47
! 1311
! 953
! 2264
! 382
! 531
! 0.4
! 0.4
! 13.3
! 9.7
! 23.1
! 3.8
! 5.4
|}

References

External links

1998 births
Living people
Greater Western Sydney Giants players
Sandringham Dragons players
Australian rules footballers from Victoria (Australia)
Australian people of American descent
Kevin Sheedy Medal winners
People educated at St Kevin's College, Melbourne